Gambling in Pennsylvania includes casino gambling, the Pennsylvania Lottery, horse racing, Bingo, and small games of chance conducted by nonprofit organizations and taverns under limited circumstances. Although casino gaming has been legal for less than two decades, Pennsylvania is second only to Nevada in commercial casino revenues.

On October 26, 2017, the House passed a bill to legalize online gambling. Governor Tom Wolf signed that bill into law on October 30, 2017.

History 
The modern purpose of gambling legislation in Pennsylvania is focused on using revenues to help create more jobs, boost the economy, and stitch together the state's financial deficit.

The PA state lottery was established in Act 91 of 1971 as a government run entity. The purpose of the lottery, as stated in the bill, is to provide property tax relief to the elderly for property taxes paid in 1971 and thereafter to persons 65 years of age or older. The lottery is also intended to curb illegal gambling operations that were taking place in PA. The bill also outlines the procedures for selling tickets, commercial advertising, and distribution of prizes. The passing of this bill led to repeated pushes for casinos in the 1980s-1990s.The first major effort to establish casinos took place in the Pocono Mountains Resort Area. Several polls were taken in the region, and in all cases residents rejected the idea. This is primarily due to a general apprehension about gambling in the 1980s. Pennsylvanians looked to Nevada as an example of what casinos could do to a society, and saw nothing but corruption and criminals. 

In 1993 and 1994, there was another push for gambling, this time on riverboats in state waterways. Although supporters of riverboats were determined that legalizing riverboat gambling would bring more money into Pennsylvania, fiscal experts and social scientists had said that the gambling industry could generate crime and actually cost the state money. Likewise, the opposers of gambling said legalization would have a corrosive effect on families, and would increase the number of business failures, crimes, and traffic congestion. Another reason riverboat gambling legislation failed to be passed in the mid-1990s is that the newly elected governor, Tom Ridge, demanded a series of voter referendums as a condition for his support of any legislation. This consequently drained any existing momentum for the passage of riverboat legislation.

One last failed push for gambling in Pennsylvania occurred in 1999. A gaming bill, that was approved by the State House, would have allowed for a voter referendum to decide whether the state should have slot machines at the four racetracks, authorize riverboats, and allow video poker at taverns. However the referendum proposal was not scheduled for a vote, and this effort acquired the same outcome as legislation in the previous years.

In 2004, Pennsylvania legislators passed Act 71, making progress in their push to legalize gambling. This act, also known as the Pennsylvania Racehorse Development and Gaming Act, established the Pennsylvania Gaming Control Board and legalized casinos and racetracks within the state. It was apparent that horse racing was a viable industry that would create thousands of new jobs and bring more money into Pennsylvania.  The revenues gained by the machines and tracks would primarily go towards providing property tax relief, various horse breeders in the state, local governments, as well as various funds that were established by Act 71. The moral, social, and religious grounds on which people had previously opposed gambling became less of a factor as new generations of Pennsylvanians became adults, which eventually led to a greater public acceptance of gambling. Another factor that contributed to this acceptance was that the historic link between gambling and crime had diminished as the ownership structure of casinos had shifted to publicly traded corporations. During the first full year of operations, seven casinos produced machine revenues of over one billion dollars, which yielded tax revenues of about seven hundred and sixty-six million dollars, and by the end of 2009, the revenues of Pennsylvania machines exceeded those of machines in other states with the exception of Nevada.

The success of Act 71 led to calls for more gambling legislation to be passed in Pennsylvania. The 2017 Truck stop and Satellite casino bill included in it a plan to establish 10 new mini-casino sites, as well as expand casino-style gambling to truck stops, online portals, and airports. In 2016 there were approximately 18,000 people employed by the various racetracks and casinos around the state, all of which generate approximately $1.4 billion annually in tax revenue.

Horse racing
Horse Racing was the first type of gambling to be legalized in Pennsylvania, having been legal since the passing of the Race Horse Industry Reform Act in 1959. The first race track to open after the passage of that act was Meadows Racetrack in 1963. In addition to the racetracks, there are also several off-track betting establishments with simulcasting available. Online betting and phone betting on horse racing is also legal. Greyhound racing, however, is not permitted.

Current racetracks
</onlyinclude>
</onlyinclude>
</onlyinclude>
</onlyinclude>
</onlyinclude>

Current off-track betting locations
There are several locations offering off-track betting throughout the state. Each location is affiliated with a specific racetrack. Off-track betting has been legal since 1988. Pennsylvania was the 5th state in the country to legalize off-track betting parlors. The original legislation called for each of the four racetracks (at that time) to have a 35-mile protective radius in which the off-track locations could be established. The legislation also called for a maximum of 23 locations total throughout the state.
</onlyinclude>
</onlyinclude>
</onlyinclude>
</onlyinclude>
</onlyinclude>

Former off-track betting locations
Due to horse racing's decline in popularity, many off-track betting locations have closed. However, some operators, including Parx, will be adding sports betting to existing off-track betting locations in 2019.
</onlyinclude>
</onlyinclude>
</onlyinclude>
</onlyinclude>
</onlyinclude>

Casino gambling

Since its creation in 2004 Pennsylvania Gaming Control Board oversees all casinos in the state. 

In 2004, the Pennsylvania Race Horse Development and Gaming Act was passed which legalized slot machines at fourteen locations beginning in 2006. The act authorized licenses for seven horse track racing locations (or racinos), five standalone casinos, and two resort casinos. All casinos can have up to 5,000 machines, except the resort licensees, which can have up to 600. The Act also mandated that two of the five stand-alone casinos be located in Philadelphia, one in Pittsburgh, and the remaining two at-large.

Casinos in Pennsylvania have been permitted to  operate table games since July 2010. Stand-alone and racinos may have up to 250 table games, while resort casinos are limited to a maximum of 50 table games. Table games legislation increased the number of slots that resort casinos may have, from 500 to 600 machines. The 4th and newest license category, satellite casinos, allows existing operators to establish smaller, secondary locations.

Pennsylvania casinos set a revenue record for 2017 as a whole, generating $3.227 billion in revenues.

Types
The Pennsylvania Gaming Control Board has authorized four categories of casino licenses:
Category 1: Horse race track casinos
Category 2: Stand-alone casinos
Category 3: Resort casinos
Category 4: Satellite casinos

Lottery

The Pennsylvania Lottery has been available throughout the Commonwealth since 1972. In addition to regular drawings, the state also participates in Powerball (offered through the Multi-State Lottery Association) and Mega Millions games and sells scratchcard tickets.

Draw games offered by the Pennsylvania Lottery include Pick 2, Pick 3, Pick 4, Pick 5, Treasure Hunt, Cash 5, and Match 6, as well as the multi-state games Cash4Life, Mega Millions, and Powerball. The "Pick" games are standard fixed-payout games, while Treasure Hunt, Cash 5, and Match 6 are jackpot-style games similar to Mega Millions and Powerball. The lottery also offers the annual raffle game, Millionaire Raffle.

On May 1, 2018, the Pennsylvania lottery launched keno as a part of their gaming offerings, with drawings every 4 minutes. Results are displayed at selected lottery retailers on monitors. The Pennsylvania Lottery also launched Xpress Sports later in 2018, which include two virtual sports games, football and racing. Keno and Xpress Sports games are offered at all lottery retailers, but players can view the results live via monitors at select retailers.

Pennsylvania's gaming expansion also allowed for the creation of Pennsylvania's online lottery, iLottery, which began operation on June 4, 2018. The iLottery consists of unique games; standard draw games are not available online. iLottery has received backlash from Pennsylvania's casino operators, who claim the iLottery games are slot or casino-style in nature, and for casinos to offer online gaming in the state, they are required to pay a $10 million license fee.

Bingo and small games of chance
The Pennsylvania Local Option Small Games of Chance Act became law in 1988. The legislation allows limited gaming in non-profit organizations and in for-profit taverns. Game types include pull-tab games, punchboards, raffles (including special permit raffles), daily drawings, weekly drawings, fifty-fifty (50/50) drawings (including major league sports drawings), Race Night Games, and pools.

The Pennsylvania Bingo Law was passed in 1981 and allows for organizations to conduct bingo games.

Future expansion
On October 26, 2017, the state legislature approved a bill that would allow casino gambling at truck stops, airports, and online, including fantasy sports. The bill was signed by Pennsylvania governor Tom Wolf on October 30, 2017. The bill also would authorize licenses for ten new satellite casinos with a requirement that they be located at least 25 miles from an existing casinos. The satellite casino licenses allowing up to 750 slot machines and 30 table games would only be granted to existing owners of casinos in Pennsylvania. Municipalities also have the option to prohibit casinos within their borders.

The passage of the October 30th gambling expansion bill made Pennsylvania the fourth state to legalize online gambling, joining Nevada, New Jersey, and Delaware. Pennsylvania is the only state to offer both gaming and lottery tickets online. Finally, the law authorized casinos to offer sports betting pending a change in federal law or a possible Supreme Court ruling. On May 14, 2018 the Supreme Court declared the Professional and Amateur Sports Protection Act of 1992 unconstitutional. Casinos are expected to be able to begin offering sports betting sometime this fall even though casino winnings will be subject to 34% tax. Betting on eSports is, however, not legal.

Truck stops may operate up to five slot machines with counties having the option to prohibit gambling at truck stops. Casinos may make agreements to operate an interactive gambling parlor with an airport authority at any of Pennsylvania's international or regional airports. Pennsylvania became the only state other than Nevada to permit gaming at airports, although as of January 2018, no airport has announced plans to offer gaming. In August 2019, Rutter's and Penn National Gaming opened the first video gaming room at a Rutter's convenience store in Manchester Township in York County. There are plans to open video gaming rooms at more Rutter's locations in 2019 and 2020.

The Pennsylvania Gaming Control Board began accepting applications for online gaming licenses in July 2018. Nine casinos in the state applied by the initial deadline. The four Pennsylvania casinos that did not apply prior to the deadline can still do so in the future, but for an increased fee.

Fantasy sports
Eight providers are licensed to offer fantasy sports in Pennsylvania.
DraftKings
FanDuel
Draft
Boom Fantasy
Sportshub Technologies
Full Time Fantasy Sports
Yahoo Fantasy Sports
Fantasy Draft

Truck Stops
As of December 2019, video gaming terminals are available at eight qualified Pennsylvania truck stops.
</onlyinclude>
</onlyinclude>

Skill games
A new phenomenon across Pennsylvania is the proliferation of "skill machines". These machines, often looking like video slot machines or VGTs, are able to circumvent gaming laws due to a prior court decision that decided they were not slot machines. Thus, these machines can now be found at many bars, clubs, gas stations, and tobacco shops across the state.

Illegal gambling
Even with the proliferation of gambling in the state in recent years as Pennsylvania's gaming laws become more permissive, illegal gambling is still commonplace in Pennsylvania. Many bars, private clubs, truck stops, fire company social halls, and many other establishments have long allowed slot machines or video poker machines on the premises. Legislation has often been discussed about legalizing and regulating VGTs in these establishments, but it has yet to pass. Currently, enforcement is typically done by the Pennsylvania State Police, Bureau of Liquor Control Enforcement, and there are an estimated 40,000 illegal machines throughout the state.

Even with the legalization of sports betting in the state, the high tax rate of 36% and licensure fee of $10 million may allow the underground economy of bookmakers to continue to flourish.

List of casinos

See also
Pennsylvania Gaming Control Board

References

External links
Guide to PA casinos

 
Pennsylvania law